The Greater Bethel AME Church is a historic church in Miami, Florida. It is located at 245 Northwest 8th Street. On April 17, 1992, it was added to the U.S. National Register of Historic Places. The church was built in 1927. On February 12, 1958, Dr. Martin Luther King Jr. delivered a speech at the church, "Launching Of The SCLC Crusade For Citizenship."

References

External links

 Dade County listings at National Register of Historic Places
 Florida's Office of Cultural and Historical Programs
 Dade County listings
 Greater Bethel AME Church

African-American history in Miami
Churches in Miami
African Methodist Episcopal churches in Florida
National Register of Historic Places in Miami
Churches on the National Register of Historic Places in Florida
1927 establishments in Florida
Churches completed in 1927